Swarby is a village and former civil parish in the North Kesteven district of Lincolnshire, England, approximately  south-southwest of Sleaford,  west of the A15 road and  to the northwest of Aswarby. The village is part of the civil parish of Aswarby and Swarby   which also includes the hamlet of Crofton.

The village name is Scandinavian in origin, and comes from the Old Norse for a farmstead or village of a person named 'Svarri'.

The parish church is dedicated to Saint Mary and All Saints and is a Grade II* listed building dating from the 13th century. It was restored in 1886 and the south aisle dates from the same time. The west tower is 15th-century. On the north wall of the chancel is a rectangular ashlar wall plaque to Anthony Williams who died in 1681.

Swarby CE School was built in 1859, and closed in 1971.

A tornado swept through the village on 28 June 2012. It uprooted many trees, lifted a trampoline hundreds of feet and caused a garage roof to collapse while removing tiles from houses.

Notable people
The entertainer Joe Brown was born at Swarby on 13 May 1941. Despite being referred to as a Cockney, Brown is a Lincolnshire Yellowbelly.

References

External links

"Swarby", Genuki.org.uk. Retrieved 14 June 2012

Villages in Lincolnshire
North Kesteven District
Former civil parishes in Lincolnshire